This is a list of New Zealand television events and premieres which occurred, or are scheduled to occur, in 2009, the 49th year of continuous operation of television in New Zealand.

Events 

21 April - The former What Now host and Breakfast weatherman Tāmati Coffey and his partner Samantha Hitchcock win the fifth series of Dancing with the Stars.
30 June - Mandy Pickering, performing as Sarah McLachlan wins the second series of Stars in Their Eyes.

Premieres

Domestic series

International series

Telemovies and miniseries

Documentaries

Specials

Programming changes

Programmes changing networks 
Criterion for inclusion in the following list is that New Zealand premiere episodes will air in New Zealand for the first time on the new network. This includes when a program is moved from a free-to-air network's primary channel to a digital multi-channel, as well as when a program moves between subscription television channels – provided the preceding criterion is met. Ended television series which change networks for repeat broadcasts are not included in the list.

Free-to-air premieres
This is a list of programmes which made their premiere on New Zealand free-to-air television that had previously premiered on New Zealand subscription television. Programs may still air on the original subscription television network.

Subscription premieres
This is a list of programmes which made their premiere on New Zealand subscription television that had previously premiered on New Zealand free-to-air television. Programmes may still air on the original free-to-air television network.

Programmes returning in 2009

Milestone episodes in 2009

Programmes ending in 2009

Deaths

References